The 2016 Elections for the Illinois House of Representatives were conducted on Tuesday, November 8, 2016. State Representatives are elected for two-year terms, with the entire House of Representatives elected every two years. The Democratic party lost a net of four seats and thus its three-fifths supermajority in the chamber.  Republicans picked up five seats in the 63rd (McHenry County), 71st (Sterling), 76th (LaSalle), 79th (Kankakee), and 117th (Marion) districts, whilst the Democrats won the previously Republican held 112th district (Edwardsville/Collinsville)

Overview

Results

Source: Illinois State Board of Elections, Ballotpedia

References

External links
Illinois State Board of Elections

2016 Illinois elections
2016
Illinois House of Representatives